A La Ronde is an 18th-century 16-sided house located near Lympstone, Exmouth, Devon, England, and in the ownership of the National Trust. The house was built for two spinster cousins, Jane and Mary Parminter. It is a Grade I listed building, as are the adjacent Point-In-View chapel, school and almshouses, together with a manse, which were also built by the cousins. The gardens are Grade II listed in the National Register of Historic Parks and Gardens.

History
The Parminter family, which could be traced back in North Devon as far back as 1600, had acquired considerable wealth as merchants. Jane was the daughter of Barnstaple wine merchant John Parminter who had a business in Lisbon, where she was born in 1750. Jane grew up in London and became guardian to her orphan cousin Mary. On her father's death in 1784, she decided to embark on the Grand Tour accompanied by her invalid sister Elizabeth, her younger orphaned cousin, and a female friend from London.

The two cousins became greatly attached to each other and in 1795 decided to set up home together in Devon. Once their house had been built they lived secluded and somewhat eccentric lives for many years until 1811 when Miss Jane died.

The house was completed in about 1796, and its design is supposedly based on the Basilica of San Vitale. The lower ground floor housed a wine cellar, strong room and kitchen and an upper octagonal gallery housed an intricate hand-crafted frieze. Between the main rooms were triangular-shaped closets with diamond shaped windows. Much of the internal decoration was produced by the two cousins, whose handicraft skills were excellent. The house also contained many of the objets d'art, especially shells, which the cousins brought back from their European Tour.

The terms of Mary's will specified that the property could be inherited only by "unmarried kinswomen". This condition held firm until in 1886 the house was transferred to the Reverend Oswald Reichel, a brother of one of the former occupants. Reichel, the sole male owner in over two hundred years, was responsible for substantial structural changes. These included the construction of a water tower and laundry room, the installation of a bathroom and central heating, the construction of upstairs bedrooms with dormer windows, the fitting of first-floor windows, a heavy pulley dumb-waiter and speaking tubes, the replacement of the original thatch with roof tiles and the addition of an external catwalk.

Since taking ownership, conservation measures by The National Trust have included removal of all but one of the very large central heating radiators installed by Reichel, restoration of the wall coverings from a deep red to the original pale green and rigging of the delicate Shell Gallery on the uppermost storey of the house with a CCTV system to allow observation without risk of damage. The original kitchen and strong room on the lower ground floor now function as a modern kitchen and tea-room.

Designer
Family tradition maintains that the house was designed by Miss Jane herself. It is more likely, however, that the plans were drawn up by "a Mr. Lowder" mentioned by a 19th-century writer. Mary's aunt by marriage, also Mary, had a sister Anne Glass, who married a Commander John Lowder, a banker. In 1778 Lowder became a property developer and built Lansdowne Place West in Bath.

Commander Lowder, however, had a son, also named John (1781–1829) who practised as a gentleman architect in Bath. Although only 17 years of age when A La Ronde was built, it is entirely feasible that the younger Lowder designed the house. In 1816 he went on to design the unusual Bath and District National School (demolished 1896), a 32-sided building with wedge-shaped classrooms.  A La Ronde may reasonably be interpreted as an early prototype for the much larger later project.

Point-in-View chapel

Although regular attendants at the Glenorchy Chapel in Exmouth, as the two ladies got older they found the journey to worship increasingly difficult. They therefore decided to commission a chapel on their own estate.  Jane Parminter died in 1811, and was buried beneath the chapel, but the work continued and the buildings were completed later that year. Inside the chapel are the words "Some point in view – We all pursue". Surrounding the chapel was a small school for six girls and almshouses for four maiden ladies of at least 50 years of age. There was also accommodation for a minister.

The two ladies took a keen interest in the conversion of Jews to Christianity. The deeds for the almshouses expressly stated that any Jewess who had embraced Christianity would have preference over all others as a candidate for a place.  An apocryphal story popular among Christian Zionists in the 1800s was that Jane Parminter attached a codicil to her will that the oak trees at A La Ronde "shall remain standing and the hand of man shall not be lifted up against them till Israel returns and is restored to the land of promise."  This codicil then inspired Lewis Way to fund and re-invigorate the London Society for Promoting Christianity amongst the Jews; Franz Delitzsch would write a pamphlet in 1877 on the Parminters called "The Oaks of A La Ronde".  However, a Society investigation in 1882 determined that no such codicil existed in Jane's will.  Despite the codicil not existing, the Parminters and Way were alike in believing that the conversion of the Jews to Christianity and their restoration to Israel were Biblically ordained prophecies and duties for Christian mission.  The connection to the oaks is less clear: the Parminters liked their trees and may have talked about them with Way, or it may have been a belief that the timber from the trees would be used to build ships for the return to the promised land.  When Mary Parminter died in 1849, she too was buried beneath the chapel.

Regular services are still held at the chapel and a Chaplain still lives in the Manse. Baptisms and weddings also remain part of the pattern of life at Point-in-View. There are also weekly classes based on old traditional art and craft techniques. These classes contribute to 'Parminter Art' a living art museum situated in the chapel.  The school closed in 1901. The Chapel and the Manse are listed Grade I and the 3-acre meadow in which they stand is listed Grade II in the National Register of Parks and Gardens. The chapel is open most days and welcomes visitors. At one time, the Trustees met annually and received one guinea for their attendance, as laid down by the Parminters.

Gallery

References

External links

A La Ronde information at the National Trust

National Trust properties in Devon
Historic house museums in Devon
Gardens in Devon
Country houses in Devon
Grade I listed houses in Devon
Grade II listed parks and gardens in Devon